Amphisbaena supernumeraria is a species of worm lizard found in Brazil.

References

supernumeraria
Reptiles described in 2009
Taxa named by Tami Mott
Taxa named by Miguel Trefaut Rodrigues
Taxa named by Enilson Medeiros dos Santos
Endemic fauna of Brazil
Reptiles of Brazil